Lost on the Grand Banks (1885) is  one of several paintings on marine subjects by the American painter Winslow Homer (1836–1910). Together with The Herring Net and The Fog Warning, painted in the same year, it depicts the hard lives of North Atlantic fishermen in Prouts Neck, Maine.
The painting was bought in 1998 by Bill Gates, the then chairman of Microsoft, who reportedly paid $30 million for the seascape, at the time a record price for an American painting.

References

Paintings by Winslow Homer
1885 paintings
Maritime paintings